Proconis is a genus of moths of the family Erebidae. The genus was erected by George Hampson in 1902.

Species
Proconis anaerygidia (Berio, 1984) Djibouti
Proconis abrostoloides Hampson, 1902 Zimbabwe
Proconis forsteri Hacker, 2016 Tanzania
Proconis ochrosia (Hampson, 1926) Saudi Arabia, Sudan
Proconis politzari (Hacker & Hausmann, 2010) Mauritania, Nigeria, Niger

References

Calpinae